Lam Beshkest may refer to:
 Bala Lam Beshkest
 Lam Beshkest-e Pain